Sphaeromiini is a tribe of biting midges, insects in the family Ceratopogonidae. There are about 7 genera and at least 40 described species in Sphaeromiini.

Genera
 Jenkinshelea Macfie, 1934
 Johannsenomyia Malloch, 1915
 Macropeza
 Mallochohelea Wirth, 1962
 Nilobezzia Kieffer, 1921
 Probezzia Kieffer, 1906
 Sphaeromias Curtis, 1928

References

Further reading

External links

 

Ceratopogonidae
Nematocera tribes